Fernaldia is a genus of flowering plants in the family Apocynaceae, first described as a genus in 1932. It is native to Mexico and Central America.

Species
 Fernaldia asperoglottis Woodson - México State, Michoacán, Guerrero
 Fernaldia pandurata (A.DC.) Woodson - widespread from Tamaulipas to Costa Rica
 Fernaldia speciosissima Woodson - Panama, Costa Rica

References

Apocynaceae genera
Flora of North America
Echiteae